"You Don't Know Anything" is a song by American indie rock band Ivy. It was released by Atlantic Records on April 29, 1999 as the fourth and final single from their second studio album, Apartment Life (1997). The single was made available exclusively in Europe and featured the same two B-sides as previous single, "This Is the Day", which had been released by 550 Music in Austria. The track was written by Dominique Durand, Adam Schlesinger and Andy Chase while production was handled by the latter two and Peter Nashel.

Released alongside "This Is the Day", "You Don't Know Anything" received promotion by Atlantic Records after the former track was included on the soundtrack for the 1998 film, There's Something About Mary. The recording received generally favorable reviews from music critics who compared the song to the works of Irish rock group My Bloody Valentine.

Background and composition 
"You Don't Know Anything" was written by Ivy band members Dominique Durand, Adam Schlesinger and Andy Chase. The production of the track was handled by Chase and Schlesinger, with additional production provided by Peter Nashel. Musically, "You Don't Know Anything" is a pop rock/indie rock song, also incorporating elements of indie pop and guitar accords. Lyrically, the song discusses a lover being "clueless" and "in the wrong".

The single was heavily compared to My Bloody Valentine; in their review of the track, Sputnikmusic stated that it "comes off like a My Bloody Valentine song with intelligible vocals, with a sliding, reverb heavy hook and pummeling drums", while AllMusic writer Jack Rabid drew similar comparisons. Patrick Carmosino of West Net stated that with "You Don't Know Anything", Ivy "have an indie-ethic rock side that compliments their pop sensibilities to the tee".

Release 
The recording was released simultaneously with the release of the single "This Is the Day"; this occurred after the latter track was featured in the 1998 film, There's Something About Mary. "You Don't Know Anything" was released as a CD single exclusively in European countries; the CD included two B-side tracks, "Sleeping Late" and "Sweet Mary".

Critical reception 
"You Don't Know Anything" received generally positive reviews from music critics. Stephen Thompson of The A.V. Club praised the track and Apartment Life for "sound[ing] slickly pretty and mannered". AllMusic named the song "a knockout" and praised it for allowing "the guitars [to] get mean". Reviewer Scott Floman was more mixed with his review, finding the track to "pass by pleasantly but unremarkably".

Track listing

Credits and personnel 
Credits and personnel adapted from "You Don't Know Anything" liner notes and Andy Chase's discography.
Recording
 Recorded at The Place, New York City; Duotone Studios, New York City; and Compositions, New York City

Personnel

Andy Chase – engineering, executive producer, mixing
Dominique Durand – lead and background vocals
Matthew Ellard – assistant mixing
Philippe Garcia – photography
Josh Grier – legal advisor
James Iha – background vocals, additional production

Paul Q. Kolderie – mixing
Bob Ludwig – mastering
Q Prime – management
Brenda Rotheiser – art direction, design
Adam Schlesinger – engineering, executive producer, mixing
Sean Slade – mixing

Release history

References 

Ivy (band) songs
1997 songs
1999 singles
Atlantic Records singles
Songs written by Adam Schlesinger
Songs written by Andy Chase
Songs written by Dominique Durand